Risen Star (March 25, 1985 – March 13, 1998) was an American Thoroughbred racehorse who won the Preakness Stakes and Belmont Stakes in 1988.

Background
The dark bay colt was the son of the great Triple Crown winner Secretariat and out of the mare Ribbon. Bred by Arthur B. Hancock III and Leone J. Peters, Risen Star was bought by Louisianans Ronnie Lamarque and Louie Roussel III at the 1987 Calder Two-Year-Olds In Training sale. He was trained by Roussel, a devout Roman Catholic who was stricken by throat cancer but recovered. Ten percent of Risen Star's winnings were donated to the "Little Sisters of the Poor," a Roman Catholic order of nuns.

Racing career
As a two-year-old Risen Star was lightly raced, winning the Minstrel Stakes at Louisiana Downs.

Risen Star started his sophomore season by winning the Grade 2 Louisiana Derby under jockey Shane Romero. Then, two weeks prior to the Kentucky Derby he had another Grade 2 victory in the Lexington Stakes in which he was ridden by Jacinto Vasquez.

He went into the prestigious Kentucky Derby as the morning-line third choice. All the colts in the Derby laid off the pace, their jockeys believing that the front-running grey filly Winning Colors would tire at the end of the race. But she didn't tire, and won the race by a neck going wire to wire. Under jockey Eddie Delahoussaye, Risen Star was forced to the outside on the backstretch where he stayed until making a charge at the head of the stretch. He was too late to make up all the lost ground to the front runner and finished third.

Two weeks later in the Preakness Stakes, Risen Star and  Delahoussaye won the second leg of the Triple Crown, turning the tables on his filly rival Winning Colors to win by 1 lengths over Brian's Time, Winning Colors, and local favorite Private Terms. With his sire (Secretariat) and grandsire (Bold Ruler), three successive generations won the Preakness Stakes, a feat accomplished only one other time.

In the Belmont Stakes, the third leg of the Triple Crown, Risen Star and Delahoussaye pulled away from the field to win by 14 lengths with a final time of 2:26. It is the fourth fastest Belmont Stakes behind Hall of Famers A.P. Indy, Easy Goer, and Secretariat. Because of his two Classic victories, Risen Star won the second $1,000,000 Chrysler Triple Crown Bonus that was awarded to the three-year-old with the best finishes in the three races.

Retirement
An injury that occurred in the Belmont forced Risen Star into early retirement. He won the Eclipse Award as 1988's top three-year-old. By winning the Eclipse, he became the first third-generation Eclipse Award winner in the same category (his sire Secretariat won in 1973 and his grandsire Bold Ruler won in 1957). Risen Star was retired to stud and went on to sire the millionaire Grade One winner Star Standard, as well as German runner Risen Raven.

Risen Star died on March 13, 1998, at Walmac International, where he is buried. A top Kentucky Derby prep race, the Risen Star Stakes, is named in his honor. it is held annually at Fair Grounds Race Course in New Orleans, Louisiana.

Breeding

References

 Risen Star's pedigree and partial racing stats

1985 racehorse births
1998 racehorse deaths
Racehorses bred in Kentucky
Racehorses trained in the United States
Eclipse Award winners
Preakness Stakes winners
Belmont Stakes winners
Hancock family
American Grade 1 Stakes winners
Thoroughbred family 9-c